Alfred Jesse Smith (born July 26, 1941), better known as Brenton Wood, is an American singer and songwriter known for his two 1967 hit singles, "The Oogum Boogum Song" (peaking at No. 34 on the US Billboard Hot 100) and "Gimme Little Sign" (peaking at No. 9).

Early life
Wood was born in Shreveport, Louisiana, United States. The family moved to San Pedro in Los Angeles, California, when Wood was a child. He attended San Pedro High School for part of his first year before moving to Compton, where Brenton became a member of the Compton High School track team and received several awards for his athletic achievements.

Following his high school graduation, Wood enrolled in East Los Angeles College.  Soon after, he took the stage name Brenton Wood, possibly inspired by the wealthy Los Angeles enclave of Brentwood (some sources state that the name is in honor of his "home county"), with a second possible connection of Bretton Woods.  During this period, his musical interests began to manifest themselves. He was inspired by Jesse Belvin and Sam Cooke, and he began cultivating his songwriting skills, also becoming a competent pianist.

Career
Early singles for Brent Records and Wand Records failed to chart.  Wood signed with Double Shot Records, and his novelty song "The Oogum Boogum Song", reached No. 19 on the US Billboard R&B chart and No. 34 on the Billboard Hot 100 in the spring of 1967.  In Southern California, "The Oogum Boogum Song" hit the top 10 on KGB-FM and No. 1 on KHJ.  Wood's biggest hit came a few months later, as "Gimme Little Sign" hit No. 9 on the pop chart, No. 19 on the R&B charts, No. 2 on KHJ, and No. 8 in the UK Singles Chart; sold over one million copies; and was awarded a gold disc.  The title is not actually sung in the song; the chorus instead repeats "Give Me Some Kind of Sign".  Wood's "Baby You Got It" (1967) peaked at No. 34 on the Hot 100 during the last week of 1967 and No. 3 on KHJ on January 31, 1968. His backing band During the 1960s was the LA-based Kent and The Candidates which was led by drummer Kent Sprague. They also recorded several singles for the Double Shot label.

A true music entrepreneur, in 1972 he formed his own record label and released, co-produced and co-wrote the Funk Soul classic "Sticky Boom Boom [Too Cold] Part I and II" with collaborators George Semper (co-producer, arranger) and Al McKay (co-writer, performer) of Earth, Wind & Fire fame. Wood recorded a duet with Shirley Goodman.  His next solo song to reach the charts was "Come Softly to Me" in 1977.

He returned again in 1986 with the album Out of the Woodwork, which included contemporary re-recordings of his early hits, along with several new tracks, including the single, "Soothe Me". His album This Love Is for Real came out in 2001. Among his later appearances was in 2006 on the Los Angeles public access program Thee Mr. Duran Show, where Wood and his band performed several of his hit singles.

In 2014, he partnered with William Pilgrim & The All Grows Up for a remake of the song "Gimme Little Sign" on their album, Epic Endings.

In 2019, "The Oogum Boogum Song" was used in a commercial for Kinder Joy products.

Discography

Albums
Studio
Oogum Boogum (1967) –  (Double Shot) – Billboard Hot 200 No. 184
Gimme Little Sign (1967) –  (Liberty) – 'UK version of Oogum Boogum '
Baby You Got It (1967)
Come Softly (1977) – (Cream)
Out of the Woodwork (1986) – (Golden Oldies)
Sweet Old School (1995)
Classic By Design (2000)
This Love Is for Real (2001)
Lord Hear My Prayer (2009)

Compilations
Brenton Wood's 18 Best (1991)
18 More of the Best, Vol. 2 (1999)
Better Believe It (2000) – (Demon / Westside)

Singles
"Hide-a-Way" (1963)
"I Want Love" (1966)
"Sweet Molly Malone" (1966)
"The Oogum Boogum Song" (1967) – US Billboard Hot 100 #34; US R&B No. 19
"Gimme Little Sign" (1967) – US Billboard Hot 100 #9; US R&B #19; UK Singles Chart No. 8
"Baby You Got It" (1967) – US Billboard Hot 100 #34; US R&B No. 30
"Lovey Dovey Kinda Lovin'" (1968) – US Billboard Hot 100 No. 99
"Some Got It, Some Don't" (1968) – US Billboard R&B No. 42
"It's Just a Game, Love" (1968)
"A Change Is Gonna Come" (1969) – US Billboard "Bubbling Under" #131
"Whoop It On Me" (1969)
"Great Big Bundle of Love" (1970)
"Boogaloosa Louisian'" (1970)
"Sad Little Song" (1971)
"Sticky Boom Boom (Too Cold)" (1972)
"You're Beautiful People" (1973)
"Another Saturday Night" (1973)
"All That Jazz" (1975)
"Rainin' Love (You Gotta Feel It)" (1975)
"It Only Make Me Want It More" (1975)
"Bless Your Little Heart" (1976)
"Come Softly To Me" (1977) – US R&B No. 92
"Number One" (1977)
"Let's Get Crazy Together" (1978)

Filmography
Popdown – (1967) – (Brenton Wood appeared in the movie, alongside Julie Driscoll, Zoot Money, Andy Summers, Don Partridge, and Tony Hicks.

See also
List of performers on Top of the Pops
List of soul musicians

References

External links
[ Brenton Wood biography] at Allmusic website

1941 births
Living people
Songwriters from Louisiana
Musicians from Shreveport, Louisiana
Musicians from Los Angeles
Musicians from Compton, California
20th-century African-American male singers
American male pop singers
Singers from California
Songwriters from California
Singers from Louisiana
Wand Records artists
African-American songwriters
21st-century African-American people
American male songwriters